The 6th Annual Tony Awards, presented by the American Theatre Wing, took place at the Waldorf-Astoria Grand Ballroom, on March 30, 1952. It was broadcast on radio station WOR and the Mutual Network. The Antoinette Perry Awards for Excellence in Theatre, more commonly known as the Tony Awards, recognize achievement in Broadway theatre.

Ceremony
The presenter was Helen Hayes.

Performers were Odette Myrtil with her son Roger Adams; and Victor Borge.

Music was by Meyer Davis and his Orchestra.

Award winners
Source: InfoPlease

Production

Performance

Craft

Special awards
Edward Kook, for his contributing to and encouraging the development of stage lighting and electronics
Judy Garland, for an important contribution to the revival of vaudeville through her recent stint at the Palace Theatre
Charles Boyer, for distinguished performance in Don Juan in Hell, thereby assisting in a new theatre trend

Multiple nominations and awards

The following productions received multiple awards.

5 wins: The King and I
3 wins: Pal Joey 
2 wins: The Fourposter, I Am a Camera and The Shrike

References

External links
1952 - 6th Annual Tony Awards, The American Theatre Wing's Tony Awards
1952 Tony Award Winners, Broadwayworld.com

Tony Awards ceremonies
1952 in theatre
1952 awards
1952 in the United States
Tony Awards